Handi Ganduvaru Dhonkamana is a 2006 Maldivian comedy short-film written, produced and directed by Ali Seezan. The film stars Ali Seezan, Niuma Mohamed and Lufshan Shakeeb in pivotal roles. A sequel of the film titled Handi Ganduvaru Dhonkamana 2½ was released in 2007.

Premise
Kamana (Niuma Mohamed), an explanatory young woman from a magical planet lands on Earth hoping to understand the human behavior and find a man whom she loves. Director (Ibrahim Wisan) and actor, Zaid Khan (Lufshan Shakeeb) hunts for a newcomer to star in their next venture, Handi Ganduvaru Dhonkamana. Despite her father's objection, Kamana auditions for the role of Kamana, the wife of Dhon Mohamed, played by Zaid. Kamana, along with her friend, Snow White (Khadheeja Ibrahim Didi) hatch a plan to teach a lesson to the proud and arrogant Zaid.

Cast 
 Ali Seezan
 Niuma Mohamed as Kamana
 Lufshan Shakeeb as Zaid Khan
 Ibrahim Wisan as Spielberg
 Khadheeja Ibrahim Didi as Snow White
 Ahmed Asim as Mahesh
 Vikash
 Reeko Moosa Manik (special appearance)

Soundtrack

References

Maldivian short films
2006 short films
Films directed by Ali Seezan